Cedar Ridge High School is a school in Hillsborough, North Carolina. It is one of two high schools in the Orange County Schools. 

It opened in 2002 in order to relieve overcrowding at Orange High School. It serves the southern half of Hillsborough and almost all of Orange County south of I-85 except Chapel Hill and Carrboro, which are served by Chapel Hill-Carrboro City Schools.
Notable Alumnus
Trenton Gill- Punter drafted by Chicago Bears Round 7 Pick 34 (255 overall)

Demographics
The demographic breakdown of the 1,020 students enrolled in 2018–19 was:
Male50.8%
Female49.2%
Asian/Pacific islanders2.1%
Black9.2%
Hispanic30.2%
White54.5%
Multiracial3.7%

32.0% of the students were eligible for free or reduced-cost lunch.

References

External links
 

Public high schools in North Carolina
Schools in Orange County, North Carolina
Hillsborough, North Carolina